The following is a list of awards and nominations received by Irish-German actor Michael Fassbender throughout his acting career.

By award

Academy Awards

AACTA International Awards

British Academy Film Awards

British Independent Film Awards

Critics' Choice Movie Awards

Empire Awards

European Film Awards

Golden Globe Awards

Irish Film & Television Awards

London Film Critics' Circle

National Board of Review

Online Film Critics Society

Satellite Awards

Screen Actors Guild Awards

Venice International Film Festival

By film or TV series

Hunger (2008)
 British Independent Film Award – 2008: Best Actor (won)
 Chicago International Film Festival – 2008: Silver Hugo for Best Actor (won)
 European Film Award – 2008: Best Actor (nominated)
 Festival du nouveau cinéma – 2008: Acting Award (won)
 Stockholm International Film Festival – 2008: Best Actor (won)
 Evening Standard British Film Award – 2009: Best Actor (nominated)
 Irish Film & Television Academy – 2009: Best Actor in a Lead Role in a Film (won)
 London Film Critics' Circle – 2009: British Actor of the Year (won)
 Toronto Film Critics Association – 2009: Best Actor (nominated)

The Devil's Whore (2008)
 Irish Film & Television Academy – 2009: Best Actor in a Supporting Role in Television (nominated)

Fish Tank (2009)
 British Independent Film Award – 2009: Best Supporting Actor (nominated)
 Chicago International Film Festival – 2009: Gold Plaque for Best Supporting Actor (won)
 Irish Film & Television Academy – 2010: Best Actor in a Supporting Role in a Film (nominated)
 London Film Critics' Circle – 2010: British Supporting Actor of the Year (won)

Inglourious Basterds (2009)
 Critics' Choice Movie Award – 2010: Best Acting Ensemble (won)
 Screen Actors Guild Award – 2010: Outstanding Performance by a Cast in a Motion Picture (won)
 San Diego Film Critics Society – 2010: Best Performance by an Ensemble (won)

X-Men: First Class (2011)
 IGN Award – 2011: Best Ensemble Cast (won)
 IGN Award – 2011: Best Villain (won)
 Los Angeles Film Critics Association – 2011: Best Actor (won)
 National Board of Review – 2011: Spotlight Award (won)
 People's Choice Award – 2011: Favorite Ensemble Movie Cast (nominated)
 Scream Award – 2011: Best Fantasy Actor (nominated)
 Scream Award – 2011: Breakout Performance – Male (nominated)
 Scream Award – 2011: Best Ensemble (nominated)

Jane Eyre (2011)
 Los Angeles Film Critics Association – 2011: Best Actor (won)
 National Board of Review – 2011: Spotlight Award (won)

A Dangerous Method (2011)
 Los Angeles Film Critics Association – 2011: Best Actor (won)
 National Board of Review – 2011: Spotlight Award (won)
 Genie Award – 2012: Best Actor in a Leading Role (nominated)
 London Film Critics' Circle – 2012: British Actor of the Year (won)

Shame (2011)
 British Independent Film Award – 2011: Best Actor (won)
 Chicago Film Critics Association – 2011: Best Actor (nominated)
 Critics' Choice Movie Award – 2011: Best Actor (nominated)
 Detroit Film Critics Society – 2011: Best Actor (won)
 Florida Film Critics Circle – 2011: Best Actor (won)
 Golden Globe Award – 2011: Best Actor – Motion Picture Drama (nominated)
 Houston Film Critics – 2011: Best Actor (won)
 Los Angeles Film Critics Association – 2011: Best Actor (won)
 National Board of Review – 2011: Spotlight Award (won)
 Online Film Critics Society – 2011: Best Actor (won)
 Phoenix Film Critics Society – 2011: Best Actor (nominated)
 Satellite Award – 2011: Best Actor in a Motion Picture (nominated)
 Seville European Film Festival – 2011: Best Actor (won)
 St. Louis Gateway Film Critics Association – 2011: Best Actor (nominated)
 Venice Film Festival – 2011: Volpi Cup for Best Actor (won)
 WAFCA Award – 2011: Best Actor (nominated)
 Alliance of Women Film Journalists Award – 2012: Best Actor (won)
 Australian Academy of Cinema and Television Arts Award – 2012: AACTA International Award for Best Actor (nominated)
 BAFTA Award – 2012: Best Actor (nominated)
 Capri, Hollywood – The International Film Festival Award – 2012: The International Film Festival Award for Best Actor (won)
 Evening Standard British Film Award – 2012: Best Actor (won)
 Denver Film Critics Society – 2012: Best Actor (nominated)
 Gay and Lesbian Entertainment Critics Association – 2012: Film Performance of the Year (nominated)
 Gay and Lesbian Entertainment Critics Association – 2012: Rising Star (won)
 IndieWire Critics Survey – 2012: Best Lead Performance (won)
 Irish Film & Television Academy – 2012: Best Actor in a Lead Role in a Film (won)
 London Film Critics' Circle – 2012: British Actor of the Year (won)
 London Film Critics' Circle – 2012: Actor of the Year (nominated)
 Richard Attenborough UK Regional Film Award – 2012: Best Actor (won)
 Toronto Film Critics Association – 2012: Best Actor (nominated)
 Vancouver Film Critics Circle – 2012: Best Actor (won)
 European Film Award – 2012: European Actor 2012 (nominated)

Prometheus (2012)
 London Film Critics' Circle – 2012: Supporting Actor of the Year (nominated)
 Saturn Award – 2013: Best Supporting Actor (nominated)

12 Years a Slave (2013)
 Independent Spirit Award – 2013: Best Supporting Male (nominated)
 Academy Award – 2014: Best Supporting Actor (nominated)
 BAFTA Award – 2014: Best Actor in a Supporting Role (nominated)
 Critics' Choice Movie Award – 2014: Best Supporting Actor (nominated)
 Golden Globe Award – 2013: Best Supporting Actor – Motion Picture (nominated)
 London Film Critics' Circle – 2013: British Actor of the Year (nominated)
 London Film Critics' Circle – 2013: Supporting Actor of the Year (nominated)
 Screen Actors Guild Award – 2013: Outstanding Performance by a Cast in a Motion Picture (nominated)
 Screen Actors Guild Award – 2013: Outstanding Performance by a Supporting Actor in a Motion Picture (nominated)
 Chicago Film Critics Association – 2013: Best Supporting Actor (nominated)
 San Diego Film Critics Society – 2013: Best Supporting Actor (nominated)
 San Francisco Film Critics Circle – 2013: Best Supporting Actor (nominated)
 Satellite Award – 2014: Best Actor in a Supporting Role (nominated)
 Vancouver Film Critics Circle – 2014: Best Supporting Actor (nominated)
 Washington D.C. Area Film Critics Association – 2013: Best Supporting Actor (nominated)
 Online Film Critics Society – 2014: Best Supporting Actor (won)
 AACTA Award – 2014: Best Supporting Actor (won)
 Empire Award – 2014: Best Supporting Actor (won)
 Irish Film & Television Academy – 2014: Best Actor in a Supporting Role in a Film (won)

Frank (2014)
 British Independent Film Award – 2014: Best Supporting Actor (nominated)
 Chlotrudis Award – 2015: Best Supporting Actor (nominated)
 Irish Film & Television Academy – 2015: Best Actor in a Lead Role in a Film (nominated)

X-Men: Days of Future Past (2014)
 Teen Choice Award – 2014: Choice Movie Villain (nominated)

Macbeth (2015)
 British Independent Film Award – 2015: Best Actor (nominated)

Steve Jobs (2015)
 Washington D.C. Area Film Critics Association – 2015: Best Actor (nominated)
 Los Angeles Film Critics Association – 2015: Best Actor (won)
 Online Film Critics Society – 2015: Best Actor (won)
 Austin Film Critics Association – 2015: Best Actor (won)
 Satellite Award – 2015: Best Actor (nominated)
 Screen Actors Guild Award – 2015: Outstanding Performance for an Actor in a Lead Role (nominated)
 Golden Globe Award – 2015: Best Actor – Motion Picture Drama (nominated)
 Houston Film Critics Society – 2015: Best Actor (won)
 Critics' Choice Movie Award – 2015: Best Actor (nominated)

References
 IMDb.com

Fassbender, Michael